The Niagara Frontier Transportation Authority (also known as "NFTA" or "Metro") operates a fleet of buses and light rail vehicles in the cities of Buffalo and Niagara Falls and the surrounding Erie and Niagara counties. It is the second-largest transit system in New York state after New York City's.

Rail cars

Buses

Abbreviations

See also 
 Niagara Frontier Transportation Authority

References 

Niagara Frontier Transportation Authority